Heuglin's gull (Larus fuscus heuglini) or the Siberian gull, is a seabird in the genus Larus.

Taxonomy
It is sometimes considered as a separate species (Larus heuglini) but is now usually treated as a subspecies of the lesser black-backed gull. Birds in the eastern part of Heuglin's gull's range are often paler grey above and sometimes considered to be a separate subspecies Larus fuscus taimyrensis (Taimyr gull). It is possible that they are a result of hybridization between Heuglin's gulls and Vega gulls.

Distribution and habitat
Heuglin's gulls breed in the tundra of northern Russia from the Kola Peninsula east to the Taymyr Peninsula. They are regularly reported from Finland and may breed there. They migrate south to winter in Southwest Asia, the Indian Subcontinent, East Asia, and East Africa. Small numbers are seen in Southeast Asia, it has been recorded in South Africa and it may occur as a vagrant in Western Europe.

Description
They are large gulls with a rounded head, strong bill and long legs and wings. The back and wings are dark grey, variable in shade but often similar to the graelsii race of the slightly smaller lesser black-backed gull. In winter the head is only lightly streaked with brown but there is heavier streaking on the hindneck. The legs are usually yellow but can be pink.

Growth
Moulting takes place later than in most of their relatives so birds still have unstreaked heads and worn primaries in September and October. The primary feathers may not be fully grown until February or March when the head is still streaked.

Diet
They feed mainly on molluscs, worms, and crustaceans.

References 
 Paul Doherty & Bill Oddie (2001) Gulls: A Video Guide to the Gulls of Europe, Asia & North America. Videocassette. Bird Images.
 Klaus Malling Olsen & Hans Larsson (2003) Gulls of North America, Europe, and Asia, Princeton University Press.
 Craig Robson (2002) A Field Guide to the Birds of South-East Asia. New Holland, London.
 Adrian Skerrett, Ian Bullock & Tony Disley (2001), Birds of Seychelles, Christopher Helm, London.

External links 
 Heuglin's Gull, Gull Research Organization
 The "Herring Gull" Assemblage in South Korea, Birding Korea

Heuglin's gull
Birds of the Arctic
Birds of Europe
Birds of Russia
Birds of Africa
Heuglin's gull